Daniel Dunst (born 12 April 1984) is a former Austrian footballer who played as a defender.

Club career
Dunst has played for SC Austria Lustenau and SC Wiener Neustadt in the Austrian Football Bundesliga and also Swiss Super League side FC St. Gallen.

References

External links
Guardian Football

1984 births
Sportspeople from Baden bei Wien
Living people
Austrian footballers
Association football defenders
FC Admira Wacker Mödling players
First Vienna FC players
SC Austria Lustenau players
SC Wiener Neustadt players
FC St. Gallen players
Wolfsberger AC players
Austrian Football Bundesliga players
2. Liga (Austria) players
Austrian Regionalliga players
Austrian 2. Landesliga players
Swiss Super League players
Austrian expatriate footballers
Expatriate footballers in Switzerland
Footballers from Lower Austria